Vasco Azevedo Neto (25 February 1916 – 30 September 2010) was a Brazilian engineer and politician. He served as federal deputy for Bahia from 1970 to 1986.

In the 1998 general election, he ran for the Presidency of Brazil by the Humanist Party of Solidarity (PHS), with no success.

Personal life 
He was born in Guaxupé, Minas Gerais in 25 February 1916. In 1939, he graduated in the Polytechnic School of the Federal University of Bahia.

References 

People from Guaxupé
1916 births
2010 deaths
20th-century Brazilian engineers
21st-century Brazilian engineers
Brazilian engineers
Federal University of Bahia alumni
Candidates for President of Brazil
Humanist Party of Solidarity politicians
Social Christian Party (Brazil) politicians
Democrats (Brazil) politicians
Democratic Social Party politicians
National Renewal Alliance politicians
Members of the Chamber of Deputies (Brazil) from Bahia